This is a list of British playwrights.

20th-century British playwrights 
See also the more extensive list at British playwrights since 1950.

Jim Allen
John Arden
Alan Ayckbourn
John Roman Baker
Howard Barker
Peter Barnes
J. M. Barrie
Alan Bennett
Tess Berry-Hart
Robert Bolt
Tejas Saini
Edward Bond
John Griffith Bowen
Howard Brenton
Leo Butler
John Caine
George Calderon
Caryl Churchill
Noël Coward
Martin Crimp
Tim Crouch
April De Angelis
Keith Dewhurst
Nell Dunn
David Edgar
Ben Elton
Michael Frayn
John Galsworthy
Simon Gray
David Greig
Trevor Griffiths
David Hare
Catherine Johnson
Terry Johnson
Sarah Kane
Sue Lenier
Saunders Lewis
Henry Livings
Frederick Lonsdale
Stephen Lowe
David Mercer
Edgar Middleton
Raman Mundair
Peter Nichols
Onyeka
Joe Orton
John Osborne
Harold Pinter
Alan Plater
J. B. Priestley
Peter Quilter
Terence Rattigan
David Rudkin
Willy Russell
James Saunders
Anthony Shaffer
Peter Shaffer
R. C. Sherriff
Dodie Smith
Gladys Bronwyn Stern
Tom Stoppard
David Storey
Alfred Sutro
Herbert Swears
Miles Tredinnick
Keith Waterhouse
Timberlake Wertenbaker
Arnold Wesker
Emlyn Williams
Snoo Wilson
Charles Wood
Lauri Wylie

See also
List of English playwrights
List of Scottish playwrights

Lists of dramatists and playwrights

Playwrights
Playwrights